FK Palilulac Niš is a football club based in Niš, Serbia. They currently compete in the Niš First League, the fifth tier of the national league system.

Honours
Niš First League (Tier 5)
 2010–11
Niš Second League (Tier 6)
 2013–14

External links
 Club page at Srbijasport

1952 establishments in Serbia
Association football clubs established in 1952
Football clubs in Serbia
Sport in Niš